National Highway 58 (NH 58 NEW) is a  National Highway in India connecting Fatehpur and Udaipur in the state of Rajasthan. NH58 route is extended from Udaipur to Palanpur in Gujarat.

Route

Rajasthan 
Fatehpur, Asota, Ladnun, Nagaur, Merta City, Ajmer, Beawar, Devgarh, Udaipur, Kumdal, Naya Kheda, Jhadol, Som, Nalwa Daiya, Gujarat border.

Gujarat 
Rajasthan Border - Idar - Vadali - Dharoi - Satlasana - Palanpur.

Junctions  
 
  Terminal near Fatehpur.
  Terminal near Fatehpur
  near Ladnun.
  near Nagaur.
  near Merta.
  near Tehla
  near Ajmer.
  near Beawar.
  near Beawar.
  near Bheem.
  near Bheem.
  near Udaipur.
  near Palanpur.

Map with spur routes

See also 
 List of National Highways
 List of National Highways in India by state

References

External links 
 NH 58 on OpenStreetMap

National highways in India
National Highways in Rajasthan
National Highways in Gujarat
Transport in Udhampur